"Showtime" was the twenty-fourth (and final) episode of the first season of the American television series M*A*S*H. It originally aired on March 25, 1973.

Plot
A USO show is held at the 4077th, consisting of a stand-up comic and a female singing trio backed by a small band. The performance is juxtaposed with scenes from everyday life in the camp. Henry's wife gives birth to a son. Though Henry is depressed by not being able to see his new baby, Radar cheers him up by arranging for one of the camp's laundry workers to let him hold hers. The camp dentist receives his discharge orders and takes great pains to avoid injury and illness before he starts his trip home, only to crash his jeep and end up in traction. Frank plays a series of practical jokes on Hawkeye, sabotaging the still to spray him in the face, causing a bucket of water to fall and soak him, and rigging the showerheads to malfunction when he tries to take a shower. Hawkeye gets the last laugh by collapsing the officers' latrine tent on top of Frank while he is using it.

Production notes
"Showtime" is structurally similar to "Dear Dad" and "Dear Dad...Again," in which it lacks the conventional linear structure of most television programs. It uses moments from the USO show, styled like the ones hosted by Bob Hope, to make commentary and contrast the ugliness of war with the fluff of the performances in the show.

A sequence showing Radar playing drums with the musical band demonstrates Gary Burghoff's drumming talents onscreen. It was Burghoff's idea for him to drum in this episode as it was to pay homage to his drumming idol Gene Krupa, who actually allowed the star to play on his drums.

Guest cast
John Orchard – Ugly John: this episode marked the last appearance of the Ugly John character (a carryover figure from the original novel and movie); however, Orchard did appear in the 1979 episode "Captains Outrageous" as a different character.

References

External links

M*A*S*H (season 1) episodes
1973 American television episodes
Television episodes directed by Jackie Cooper